Michalis Kouiroukidis (born 18 January 1995) is a Greek professional footballer who plays as a forward for Super League 2 club Kifisia.

References

1995 births
Living people
Greek footballers
Super League Greece 2 players
Football League (Greece) players
Gamma Ethniki players
A.O. Glyfada players
Ergotelis F.C. players
Kallithea F.C. players
Proodeftiki F.C. players
Ionikos F.C. players
Kalamata F.C. players
Association football forwards